Midwestern Minutes is Defiance, Ohio's fourth full-length album. It is available for free on the band's website. The album has received considerable airplay in Australia, courtesy of Triple R's Bullying The Jukebox program, for which it topped their 'Best Of 2010' list.

Recording
All of the songs recorded, mixed, and mastered in March and April 2010 at Russian Recording in Bloomington, IN, except "Diamonds Theme Song" and "Everyone Else on the Other Side" which were recorded in 2009 by the Defiance, Ohio.

Critical reception 
Midwestern Minutes was met to positive critical acclaim. Darren of punknews.org gave the album 4 out of 5 stars and remarked that the album was "arguably the band's best album to date". Reviewers noted that the album was a departure form the band's rawer punk roots, and that the band has matured into their own unique sound.

Track listing

Credits
Music
 Theo Hilton - drums, guitar, piano, vocals
 Geoff Hing - guitar, vocals
 Sherri Miller - banjo, cello, vocals
 Will Staler - drums, guitar, mandolin, vocals
 Ryan Woods - bass, upright bass, vocals

Production
 Mike Bridavsky - engineer, mastering, mixing
 Defiance, Ohio - producer
 Keith McGraw - assistant engineer

References

Albums free for download by copyright owner
2010 albums
Defiance, Ohio (band) albums